Seventeen ships of the French Navy have borne the name Loire, after the longest river in France:
 , a 6-gun flute
 , a 30-gun flute
 , a flute
 , a scow
 , a 44-gun frigate
 Loire (1803), a 20-gun flute, lead ship of her two-vessel her class; destroyed with her classmate in 1809 to avoid capture by the Royal Navy
 , a scow
 Loire (1814), a flute broken up in 1838
 , a three-masted propeller-sail mixed transport vessel with a wooden hull.
 , a scow
 , a Dordogne-class troopship
  (1915), a commandeered four-masted barque
 , a requisitioned steam ship
 ,  a requisitioned cargo ship
 , an oiler
 , (1965–2009) a mine countermeasures support ship Loire (French)  (Google Translate – Loire (English))
 Loire (A602), (2018-present) lead ship of a class of four offshore support and assistance vessels deployed in Metropolitan France

Sources and references 
 NetMarine

French Navy ship names